Selenogyrus austini is a theraphosid spider. As of February 2016, it is a member of the selenogyrinae. It is native to Sierra Leone.

Etymology
The specific name "austini" is in honour of the collector of the type specimens, Mr. E. E. Austin.

Characteristics
S. austini has a characteristic crescent shaped layout of the granules on the labium, and also has unique layout of the labio-sternal "mounds": the anterior pair being larger than in other species. It also has relatively stout stridulatory clavate ("club-shaped" ) setae on the chelicerae. The spermathecae are quite narrow at their base, and the clypeus is small but not absent. It is 41mm in length. It is uniformly brown.

References

Theraphosidae
Spiders of Africa
Spiders described in 1990